Samuel Gargan (born ) is a former long serving politician and Speaker of the Legislative Assembly of the Northwest Territories.

Gargan was first elected to the Northwest Territories Legislature in the 1983 Northwest Territories general election. He was re-elected to a second term in the 1987 Northwest Territories general election. He would be returned by acclamation to a third term in the 1991 Northwest Territories general election. He would be elected Speaker by members of the Legislature on February 15, 1995. He ran for re-election to what would be his final term in the 1995 Northwest Territories general election. He served his entire fourth term as Speaker, running for a fifth term in the 1999 Northwest Territories general election. In that election he was defeated by candidate Michael McLeod losing his seat and the Speakership.

In 2009, Gargan was chosen as Grand Chief of the Dehcho First Nations.

References

Members of the Legislative Assembly of the Northwest Territories
Speakers of the Legislative Assembly of the Northwest Territories
Living people
1948 births